Sprigge is a surname. Notable people with the surname include:

A. B. S. Sprigge (1906–1980), English sculptor
Elizabeth Sprigge (1900–1979), English novelist and biographer
Joshua Sprigg or Joshua Sprigge, (1618–1684), English theologian and preacher
Samuel Squire Sprigge (1860–1937), English physician and medical editor
Sylvia Sprigge (1903–1966), British journalist and author
Timothy Sprigge (1932–1937), British philosopher
William Sprigge (1678–1735), Irish politician

See also
Sprigg (disambiguation)
Spriggs